Jabonga, officially the Municipality of Jabonga,  is a 3rd class municipality in the province of Agusan del Norte, Philippines. According to the 2020 census, it has a population of 24,855 people.

Geography
According to the Philippine Statistics Authority, the municipality has a land area of  constituting  of the  total area of Agusan del Norte.

Jabonga is bounded by Kitcharao and Surigao del Norte to the north; Butuan Bay to the west; Tubay and Santiago to the south; Surigao del Sur to the east.

The topography of the land features plain to rolling and hills. Among the municipalities, Jabonga ranks first in total area and number of farms (464) mostly owned by individuals. It has one of the 36 crop storage facilities of the province. Its major crops are coconut, rice, corn, timber and both fresh and sea-water fish.

Climate

Barangays
Jabonga is politically subdivided into 15 barangays.

Demographics

In the 2020 census, Jabonga had a population of 24,855.

Economy

References

External links
 [ Philippine Standard Geographic Code]
 Municipal Website Blog of Jabonga

Municipalities of Agusan del Norte
Populated places on Lake Mainit